Zinc finger NFX1-type containing 1 is a protein that in humans is encoded by the ZNFX1 gene.

Clinical significance 

ZNFX1 deficiency in humans is associated with severe multisystem inflammatory disease. Affected individuals may develop liver, lung or kidney failure, seizures and hemophagocytic lymphohistiocytosis (HLH) upon viral infections. Intermittent monocytosis is a hallmark laboratory finding in ZNFX1 deficiency. The disorder is thought to result from alterations in the half-life of the mRNA of interferon-stimulated genes (ISG) and is also associated with poorer clearance of viral infections in monocytes.

References

Further reading